"Nightcall" is a song by French electro house artist Kavinsky, released as a single in 2010. It was produced with Daft Punk's Guy-Manuel de Homem-Christo and mixed by electronic artist Sebastian. It features Lovefoxxx, lead singer of Brazilian band CSS, on vocals and includes remixes by Xavier de Rosnay, Jackson and his Computer Band and Breakbot. The track was used in the title sequence for the film Drive, directed by Nicolas Winding Refn and starring Ryan Gosling and Carey Mulligan. "Nightcall" was included on Kavinsky's debut studio album, OutRun (2013).

The song was also used in the soundtrack for the film The Lincoln Lawyer, directed by Brad Furman and starring Matthew McConaughey. It was sampled by Lupe Fiasco for his single "American Terrorist III", as well as by Vinny Cha$e & Kid Art for their 2012 song "Drive" as a bonus track on Golden Army.  It was also sampled by Childish Gambino for his song "R.I.P" featuring Bun B on his mixtape Royalty and by Will Young for his 2012 song called "Losing Myself".

"Nightcall" was covered by English band London Grammar for their debut album, If You Wait (2013). It was also covered by former Bluetones frontman Mark Morriss on his second solo album, A Flash of Darkness, and by English shoegaze band My Vitriol.

Track listing
12" single and promotional CD single
"Nightcall" – 4:19
"Pacific Coast Highway" – 6:23
"Nightcall" (Dustin N'Guyen Remix) – 3:34
"Pacific Coast Highway" (Jackson Remix) – 8:24
Digital bonus track
 "Nightcall" (Breakbot Remix) – 3:39
Anniversary edition digital bonus tracks
 "Nightcall" (Robotaki Remix) – 4:53
 "Nightcall" (SAWAGii Remix) – 4:47

Personnel
Credits adapted from the liner notes of OutRun.

 Kavinsky – vocals, production
 Lovefoxxx – vocals
 Sebastian – mixing
 Guy-Manuel de Homem-Christo – production
 Florian Lagatta – engineering

Charts

Certifications

London Grammar version

In 2013, English trio London Grammar covered "Nightcall" for their debut studio album, If You Wait (2013). The track was released as the album's fourth single on 8 December 2013.
The cover received positive reviews from critics, with one writer from Fortitude Magazine saying that "London Grammar’s take on the already-brilliant track is laced with sheer elegance.".

Music video 
A music video for the song was released on YouTube on 28 November 2013.

Track listings
Digital download
"Nightcall" (radio edit) – 3:38

Digital EP
"Nightcall" (LG Re-Edit) – 3:39
"Nightcall" (Freemasons' Pegasus Club Mix) – 7:34
"Nightcall" (Raaja Bones & Fyfe Dangerfield Remix) – 4:57
"Nightcall" (Special Request VIP) – 4:45
"Everywhere You Go" – 3:42

UK limited-edition 7" single
A. "Nightcall" (album version) – 4:30
B. "Everywhere You Go" – 3:42

Charts

Certifications

Release history

Usage in media
"Nightcall" plays in the background of a flashback scene in the film The Lincoln Lawyer. It also plays during the opening credits of the 2011 film Drive, and in scene 25 of Our RoboCop Remake as directed by Nicolas Winding Refn. The song is used in a commercial for the Sony Xperia phone promoting its low-light camera features. The song is also featured in the CW show Riverdale in episode 99.

References

External links
 "Nightcall" digital single on Bandcamp

2010 debut singles
2010 songs
2013 singles
English-language French songs
London Grammar songs
Songs written by Guy-Manuel de Homem-Christo
Songs written for films
Synthwave songs